CERES Community Environment Park is a  environmental education centre and social enterprise located in urban Brunswick East, Victoria, Australia. CERES (pronounced series) stands for Centre for Education and Research in Environmental Strategies. The name also connects with Ceres the goddess of agriculture in Roman mythology.

Established in 1982 on a former rubbish dump, Ceres operates on land owned by the Moreland City Council. CERES is managed as a not-for-profit incorporated association governed by a Board of Management. It provides a range of programs and services including environmental education programs and workshops, an urban farm and community gardens, cafe, grocery, plant nursery and various other social enterprises. Ceres is managed with the principal purpose of "protecting and enhancing the natural environment, including by providing information and education to increase understanding of human impacts on the natural environment".

History

CERES is located on the banks of the Merri Creek, land that was occupied by the Wurundjeri, prior to European invasion. The creek was subjected to heavy industrial use throughout much of the 20th century and the East Brunswick site was quarried for bluestone, and then eventually turned into a landfill for household and construction waste. The water became more polluted as a result of this. In 1982, some locals of the area suggested making use of the land to grow vegetables and make compost as part of a "work-for-the-dole" program. Shortly afterwards, invitations for school kids to learn about these emerging programs in green technology, recycling and organic farming. Along with Merri Creek Management Committee and Friends of Merri Creek, CERES and volunteers planted hundreds of trees and shrubs and lobbied governments to clean up the creek.
The first Sacred Kingfishers which returned to the land were spotted in 1994.
Ever since, the community park has been a place for education, practice and awareness for the environment and sustainability, as well as a location for social gatherings.
The first tree was officially planted on the site by Dr Barbe Baker—founder of the Men of the Trees—on 16 September 1981.

Awards 
Victorian Premier's Sustainability Awards 2017 – Education

See also
 Collingwood Children's Farm
 Organic farming
 Permaculture
 Sustainability

References

 Worms work for unemployed

External links
CERES official website
CERES Fair Food

Parks in Melbourne
Environment of Victoria (Australia)
Buildings and structures in the City of Merri-bek